Gérard Desanghere (16 November 1947 – 17 April 2018) was a Belgian professional footballer who played for Anderlecht and RWDM, where he won a championship title. He later played for Eendracht Aalst and Denderhoutem.

Honours 
RWD Molenbeek

 Belgian First Division: 1974–75

References

External links
 

1947 births
2018 deaths
Belgian footballers
R.S.C. Anderlecht players
R.W.D. Molenbeek players
S.C. Eendracht Aalst players
Belgian Pro League players
Association football defenders
Belgium international footballers
People from Diksmuide